The 1999 Harrogate Council election took place on 6 May 1999 to elect members of Harrogate Borough Council in North Yorkshire, England. One third of the council was up for election and the Liberal Democrats stayed in overall control of the council.

After the election, the composition of the council was:
Liberal Democrat 41
Conservative 15
Labour 3

Election result
Overall turnout in the election was 33.0%.

Ward results

References

1999
1999 English local elections
1990s in North Yorkshire